Leah Yerpe is an American artist most well-known for her, primarily black-and-white, drawings of people. Yerpe's drawings often include figures that appear to be falling or tumbling down the page. She currently lives and works in Brooklyn, NY.

Early life 
Yerpe was born and raised in Cattaraugus County, NY. She grew up around farms in western New York. The subjects of her early drawings were often drawn from the natural world she experienced in her youth.

Education 
Yerpe attended the State University of New York at Fredonia, Fredonia, NY. She graduated summa cum laude in 2007 with a B.F.A. in Painting and Drawing and a Minor in Art History.

For her graduate studies, Yerpe attended the Pratt Institute in Brooklyn, NY. She earned her M.F.A. in Painting and Drawing in 2009.

Work 
Yerpe's drawings are often sized to human scale. Her drawings regularly take hundreds of hours to complete, refining details as fine as individual hairs. Daniel Maidman of HuffPost has described Yerpe as "an artist of this extraordinarily rare type" and her work as "ultracrisp, high contrast, supercool."

Exhibitions

Solo exhibitions

2016 
 Levitation, Anna Zorina Gallery, New York City

2014 
 Constellations, Purdue University, West Lafayette, IN
 Stellify, Dillon Gallery, New York City

2013 
 Stellify, The Gallery at Le Poisson Rouge, New York City

2012 
 Infinitum, Dacia Gallery, New York City

2011 
 Illumination, Dacia Gallery, New York City

2010 
 Lost in Space, Weeks Gallery, Olean, NY

2009 
 Leah Yerpe: Thesis Exhibition, Pratt Studios Gallery, Brooklyn, NY

2004 
 Images in Black and White, Jamestown Community College, Olean, NY

Group exhibitions

2017 
 Summer Cool, Anna Zorina Gallery, New York City
 Upbeat, Anna Zorina Gallery, New York City

2016 
 Summer Hours, Anna Zorina Gallery, New York City
 A Fine Line: Masterwork Drawings, Paul Mahder Gallery, Healdsburg, CA
 Art on Paper, art fair, New York City
 Winter Tales, Anna Zorina Gallery, New York City

References

External links 
Personal website
Instagram profile

Year of birth missing (living people)
Living people
American artists
State University of New York at Fredonia alumni
Pratt Institute alumni